False Hopes is a series of albums from Minneapolis indie hip hop collective Doomtree. These albums are released in between official releases and the content sometimes reappears on the official releases in a reworked fashion. This is the 12th False Hopes installment and the 1st to feature all members of Doomtree.

Track listing

References

External links
 

2007 albums
Doomtree albums
Doomtree Records albums